Veronika Fitz (28 March 1936 – 2 January 2020) was a German television actress.

She also had some solo-shows on the stage and produced a few singles.

Selected filmography
 The Vulture Wally (1956)
 The Spessart Inn (1958)
 The Haunted Castle (1960)
 Oh! This Bavaria! (1960)
 When Ludwig Goes on Manoeuvres (1967)
 Don't Get Angry (1972)
 In aller Stille (2010)
 Die Alpenklinik - Notfall für Dr. Guth (2011)

References

External links

Agency Peter Reinholz 

German television actresses
1936 births
2020 deaths
People from Landsberg (district)
German film actresses
20th-century German actresses